The Federation of Services is a trade union representing workers in the service sector in Spain.

The union was established on 15 July 2014, when the Federation of Financial and Administrative Services merged with the National Federation of Trade, Hotels and Tourism.  Like both its predecessors, it affiliated to the Workers' Commissions.

References

External links

Trade unions established in 2014
Trade unions in Spain